L19 Ribosomal protein leaders are part of the ribosome biogenesis. They are used as an autoregulatory mechanism to control the concentration of ribosomal proteins L19, and are located in the 5′ untranslated regions of mRNAs encoding ribosomal protein L19 (rplS).
L19 ribosomal protein leaders have been bioinformatically predicted in B. subtilis and other low-GC Gram-positive bacteria in the phylum Bacillota. 
More examples that share a similar structure were predicted in Flavobacteria, also using bioinformatic approaches.

See also 
Ribosomal protein leader

References

External links 
 

Ribosomal protein leader